The Beijing ePrix was an automobile race of the Formula E championship in Beijing, People's Republic of China. It was first raced in the 2014-15 season, of which the 2014 Beijing ePrix was the first Formula E race in history.

Circuit
The ePrix took place at the Beijing Olympic Green Circuit. It ran around the grounds of the "Bird's Nest" Olympic stadium used in the 2008 Summer Olympics.

History

For the first Beijing ePrix on 13 September 2014 of the first Formula E race was ever the same time, were 75,000 spectators in the Olympic Park to the route. Admission to the event site was free, only the courts in the stands at the start-finish line were chargeable. 40 million people watched the race. Lucas di Grassi won the first ePrix. He benefited from a collision between Nicolas Prost and Nick Heidfeld, who were involved in an accident shortly before the last corner.

Results

References 

 
Beijing
Beijing ePrix
Sports competitions in Beijing
Recurring sporting events established in 2014
2014 establishments in China